An amorino ("little love") is another name for a putto.

Amorino is the first solo album released by Isobel Campbell following her departure from Belle & Sebastian. The album was released on October 7, 2003.

Track listing

References

External links
 Official website Info on the album

2003 albums
Isobel Campbell albums